Gandomriz (also Romanized as Gandomrīz, Gandom Rīz, and Gandum Riz) is a village in Howmeh Rural District, in the Central District of Dashtestan County, Bushehr Province, Iran. At the 2006 census, its population was 121, in 23 families.

References 

Populated places in Dashtestan County